Diane Keen (born 29 July 1946) is an English actress, known for her portrayal of Fliss Hawthorne in the Granada sitcom The Cuckoo Waltz and Julia Parsons on the BBC soap opera Doctors. She also appeared in Nescafé advertisements from 1980 to 1989.

Early life and education
Born in London, Keen grew up in East Africa, principally Tanganyika and later Kenya, where her father was a civil engineer. She attended boarding school and returned to Britain at the age of 19, where she became a secretary for The Ivy League's fan club; this led to her releasing a 45 r.p.m. single of "Sally Go 'Round the Roses" (credited as Dee King) on the Piccadilly label in 1966.

Career
Keen was a regular on television during the 1970s and early 1980s, starring in long-running sitcoms such as The Cuckoo Waltz, Rings on Their Fingers, Shillingbury Tales and You Must Be the Husband, and in two runs of the Thames Television children's historical costume drama The Feathered Serpent. She also guest-starred in many shows, including The Morecambe and Wise Show, and featured as Laura Dickens in the spy drama The Sandbaggers.

Keen had a part in the film Here We Go Round the Mulberry Bush (1968) as Claire, Judy Geeson's university student friend, and appeared in an episode of Budgie as Barbara, a friend of Budgie's girlfriend. She appeared in the 1977 spin-off film of 1970s TV detective series The Sweeney. Keen starred as Elisabeth of Austria-Hungary ("Sissi") in episode one of the 13-part series Fall of Eagles (1974), and played Hilda in The Professionals series 1 episode Killer With a Long Arm in 1978. In 1980, she appeared as widowed restaurant owner Christina in Series 1 episode The Dessert Song of Minder. She went on to star with David Jason in A Touch of Frost.

Keen starred for ten years in a series of advertisements for Nescafé coffee and made an appearance in an episode of Taggart. In the next decade, she became a regular in the Inspector Wexford series, playing the wife of Wexford's D.I. Roles in Brookside and several other TV shows followed, including New Tricks.

Keen has appeared onstage, including in the Alan Ayckbourn play Absent Friends at the Bristol Old Vic, and in two acclaimed tours of Same Time, Next Year. In 2013, she co-starred in a British tour of The Vagina Monologues.

Soap opera roles
Keen was a series regular in the BBC soap opera Doctors, playing practice manager Julia Parsons from 2003 to 2012. She reprised this role in March 2020 for a short stint. She also played Sandra Gould in Crossroads from 1968 to 1971, and the receptionist at the Feathers Hotel, Connelton in Emmerdale in 1972.

Personal life
Keen has one daughter, Melissa, by her marriage to Paul Greenwood, which ended in divorce in 1979. Her granddaughter, Siena Pugsley, played the role of her on-screen granddaughter in Doctors.

Selected filmography
 Popdown (1967) – Miss 1970
 Here We Go Round the Mulberry Bush (1968) – Claire
 Toomorrow (1970) – Music Student (uncredited)
 The Sex Thief (1973) – Judy Martin
 Public Eye (TV series) They All Sound Simple at First (1975) – Nina
 The Cuckoo Waltz (1975–1980) – Fliss Hawthorne
 Sweeney! (1977) – Bianca Hamilton
 The Sandbaggers Series 1, Episode 4: The Most Suitable Person (1978)
 Rings on Their Fingers (1978–80) - Sandy Bennett 
 The Shillingbury Blowers (1980) – Sally Higgins
 Silver Dream Racer (1980) – Tina Freeman
Killer Waiting (1984) – Kate Greenwood
 Thirteen at Dinner (1985) – Jenny Driver
 The Detectives (TV Series) '"D.C. of Love" (1995) – Mary
 Jekyll & Hyde (1990) – Annabel
 Nowhere in Africa (2001) – Mrs. Rubens

References

External links
 

1946 births
Living people
Actresses from London
English soap opera actresses
English stage actresses
English television actresses